Julia Slavin (born 1959) is an American short story writer and novelist who won the 2000 Rona Jaffe Foundation Writers' Award.

Her work has appeared in Gargoyle Magazine, and Tin House. Her brother is Robert Slavin.

Works
 The Woman Who Cut Off Her Leg at the Maidstone Club and Other Stories Henry Holt, 1999, ; Picador, 2000,

Criticism

Reviews

References

External links
"Julia Slavin in correspondence with Richard McCann", Believer, September 2008

21st-century American novelists
American women short story writers
Living people
American women novelists
21st-century American women writers
Rona Jaffe Foundation Writers' Award winners
21st-century American short story writers
1959 births